Fisheries Act (with its variations) is a stock short title used for legislation in multiple countries relating to fisheries. The Bill for an Act with this short title will have been known as a Fisheries Bill during its passage through Parliament.

Fisheries Acts may be a generic name either for legislation bearing that short title or for all legislation which relates to fisheries.

Bangladesh
The Protection and Conservation of Fish Act, 1950 (East Bengal Act XVIII of 1950)
 The Protection and Conservation (Amendment) Ordinance (1982) amended version of the Protection and Conservation of Fish Act, 1950
 The Protection and Conservation of Fish Rules (1985) version of the Protection and Conservation of Fish Act, 1950 implemented in 1985
 The Marine Fisheries Ordinance (1983) as implemented by The Marine Fisheries Rules (1983)
 The Tanks Improvement Act, 1939 (Bengal Act No. XV of 1939) An act that provides for the improvement of tanks in Bangladesh for purposes of aquaculture and irrigation
 The Shrimp Culture Users Tax Ordinance 1992 An act that describes tax requirement for aquaculture of shrimp farms in the coastal region of the country

Canada
The Fisheries Act

India
The Indian Fisheries Act, 1897

Malaysia
The Fisheries Act 1963
The Fisheries Act 1985

New Zealand

The Fisheries Act 1908
The Fisheries Act 1983
The Fisheries Act 1996
The Maori Fisheries Act 2004

Republic of Ireland

The Fisheries (Statute Law Revision) Act 1949
The Fisheries (Statute Law Revision) Act 1956

United Kingdom

The Fisheries Act 1705 (c 48) [12mo: c 2]
The Public Works and Fisheries Acts Amendment Act 1863 (26 & 27 Vict c 81)
The Fishery Harbours Act 1915 (5 & 6 Geo 5 c 48)
The Fisheries Act 1955 (3 & 4 Eliz 2 c 7)
The Fishery Limits Act 1964 (c 72)
The Fishery Limits Act 1976 (c 86)
The Fisheries Act 1981 (c 29)
The Aquaculture and Fisheries (Scotland) Act 2007 (asp 12)
The Foyle Fisheries Act (Northern Ireland) 1952 (c 5) (NI)
The Foyle Fisheries (Amendment) Act (Northern Ireland) 1962 (c 5) (NI)
The Fisheries Act (Northern Ireland) 1966 (c 17) (NI)
The Fisheries (Amendment) Act (Northern Ireland) 1968 (c 31) (NI)
The Fisheries (Amendment) Act (Northern Ireland) 2001 (c 4)
The Sea Fisheries Regulation Act 1966 (c 38)
The Sea Fisheries (Shellfish) Act 1967 (c 83)
The Sea Fisheries Act 1968 (c 77)
The Sea Fisheries (Shellfish) Act 1973 (c 30)
The Sea Fisheries (Wildlife Conservation) Act 1992 (c 36) 
The Sea Fisheries (Shellfish) (Amendment) Act 1997 (c 3)
The Sea Fisheries (Shellfish) Amendment (Scotland) Act 2000 (asp 12)
The Salmon and Freshwater Fisheries (Protection) (Scotland) Act 1951 (14 & 15 Geo 6 c 26)
The Salmon and Freshwater Fisheries Act 1975 (c 51)
The Freshwater and Salmon Fisheries (Scotland) Act 1976 (c 22)
The Salmon and Freshwater Fisheries (Consolidation) (Scotland) Act 2003 (asp 15)
The Oyster Fisheries (Scotland) Act 1840 (3 & 4 Vict c 74)
The Mussel Fisheries (Scotland) Act 1847 (10 & 11 Vict c 92)
The Tweed Fisheries Act 1857 (20 & 21 Vict c cxlviii)
The Tweed Fisheries Amendment Act 1859 (22 & 23 Vict c lxx)
The Tweed Fisheries Act 1969 (c xxiv)
The Seal Fishery Act 1875 (38 & 39 Vict c 18)
The Seal Fishery (North Pacific) Act 1893

The Seal Fisheries Acts 1895 and 1912 is the collective title of the Seal Fisheries (North Pacific) Act 1895 (58 & 59 Vict c 21) and the Seal Fisheries (North Pacific) Act 1912 (2 & 3 Geo 5 c 10).

The Fisheries (Ireland) Acts 1842 to 1895 was the collective title of the following Acts:
The Fisheries (Ireland) Act 1842 (5 & 6 Vict c 106) 
The Fisheries (Ireland) Act 1844 (7 & 8 Vict c 108)
The Fisheries (Ireland) Act 1845 (8 & 9 Vict c 108)
The Fisheries (Ireland) Act 1848 (11 & 12 Vict c 92)
The Fisheries (Ireland) Act 1850 (13 & 14 Vict c 88)
The Salmon Fishery (Ireland) Act 1863 (26 & 27 Vict c 114)
The Oyster Beds (Ireland) Act 1866 (29 & 30 Vict c 88)
The Oyster Fishery (Ireland) Amendment Act 1866 (29 & 30 Vict c 97)
The Salmon Fishery (Ireland) Act 1869 (32 & 33 Vict c 9)
The Fisheries (Ireland) Act 1869 (32 & 33 Vict c 92)
The Pollen Fishing (Ireland) Act 1881 (44 & 45 Vict c 66)
The Oyster Cultivation (Ireland) Act 1884 (47 & 48 Vict c 48)
The Fisheries (Ireland) Act 1888 (51 & 52 Vict c 30)
The Steam Trawling (Ireland) Act 1889 (52 & 53 Vict c 74)
The Pollen Fishing (Ireland) Act 1891 (54 & 55 Vict c 20)
The Fisheries Close Season (Ireland) Act 1895 (58 & 59 Vict c 29)

The Herring Fisheries (Scotland) Acts 1821 to 1890 was the collective title of the following Acts:
The White Herring Fisheries Act 1771 (11 Geo 3 c 31)
The Herring Fishery (Scotland) Act 1808 (48 Geo 3 c 110)
The Herring Fishery (Scotland) Act 1815 (55 Geo 3 c 94)
The Herring Fishery (Scotland) Act 1821 (1 & 2 Geo 4 c 79)
The Fisheries Act 1824 (5 Geo 4 c 64)
The Fisheries (Scotland) Act 1830 (11 Geo 4 & 1 Will 4 c 54)
The Herring Fishery Act 1851 (14 & 15 Vict c 26)
The Herring Fisheries (Scotland) Act 1858 (21 & 22 Vict c 69)
The Herring Fisheries (Scotland) Act 1860 (23 & 24 Vict c 92)
The Herring Fishery (Scotland) Act 1861 (24 & 25 Vict c 72)
The Herring Fisheries (Scotland) Act 1865 (28 & 29 Vict c 22)
The Herring Fisheries (Scotland) Act 1867 (30 & 31 Vict c 52)
The Herring Fishery (Scotland) Act 1889 (52 & 53 Vict c 23)
The Herring Fishery (Scotland) Act Amendment Act 1890 (53 & 54 Vict c 10)

The Salmon Fisheries (Scotland) Acts 1828 to 1868 was the collective title of the following Acts:
The Salmon Fisheries (Scotland) Act 1828 (9 Geo 4 c 39)
The Salmon Fisheries (Scotland) Act 1844 (7 & 8 Vict c 95)
The Salmon Fisheries (Scotland) Act 1862 (25 & 26 Vict c 97)
The Salmon Fisheries (Scotland) Act 1864 (27 & 28 Vict c 118)
The Salmon Fisheries (Scotland) Act 1868 (31 & 32 Vict c 123)

The Salmon and Freshwater Fisheries Acts 1861 to 1892 was the collective title of the following Acts:
The Salmon Fishery Act 1861 (24 & 25 Vict c 109)
The Salmon Acts Amendment Act 1863 (26 & 27 Vict c 10)
The Salmon Fishery Act 1865 (28 & 29 Vict c 121)
The Salmon Acts Amendment Act 1870 (33 & 34 Vict c 33)
The Salmon Fishery Act 1873 (36 & 37 Vict c 71)
The Salmon Fishery Act 1876 (39 & 40 Vict c 19)
The Elver Fishing Act 1876 (39 & 40 Vict c 34)
The Fisheries (Dynamite) Act 1877 (40 & 41 Vict c 65)
The Freshwater Fisheries Act 1878 (41 & 42 Vict c 39)
The Salmon Fishery Law Amendment Act 1879 (42 & 43 Vict c 26)
The Freshwater Fisheries Act 1884 (47 & 48 Vict c 11)
The Freshwater Fisheries Act 1886 (49 & 50 Vict c 2)
The Salmon and Freshwater Fisheries Act 1886 (49 & 50 Vict c 39)
The Fisheries Act 1891 (54 & 55 Vict c 37) (Parts III and IV)
The Salmon and Freshwater Fisheries Act 1892 (55 & 56 Vict c 50)

The Sea Fisheries Acts 1843 to 1893 is the collective title of the following Acts:
The Sea Fisheries Act 1843 (6 & 7 Vict c 79)
The Sea Fisheries Act 1868 (31 & 32 Vict c 45)
The Oyster and Mussel Fisheries Orders Confirmation Act 1869 (32 & 33 Vict c 31)
The Sea Fisheries Act 1875 (38 & 39 Vict c 15)
The Fisheries (Oyster, Crab, and Lobster) Act 1877 (40 & 41 Vict c 42)
The Sea Fisheries Act 1883 (46 & 47 Vict c 22)
The Sea Fisheries Act 1884 (47 & 48 Vict c 27)
The Sea Fisheries (Scotland) Amendment Act 1885 (48 & 49 Vict c 70)
The Fisheries Act 1891 (54 & 55 Vict c 37) (Part I)
The North Sea Fisheries Act 1893 (56 & 57 Vict c 17)

United States
1871 joint resolution (16 Stat. 593) creation of United States Fish Commission
The Alien Fisheries act of 1906
The Northern Pacific Halibut Act of 1924
The Marine Mammal Protection Act of 1972
The Endangered Species Act of 1973
The Magnuson–Stevens Fishery Conservation and Management Act
The Sustainable Fisheries Act of 1996

See also
List of short titles

References

Lists of legislation by short title and collective title